Alberto Molfino (11 July 1906 – 18 July 1977) was an Italian wrestler. He competed in the men's Greco-Roman lightweight at the 1936 Summer Olympics.

References

External links
 

1906 births
1977 deaths
Italian male sport wrestlers
Olympic wrestlers of Italy
Wrestlers at the 1936 Summer Olympics
Sportspeople from Genoa